Antônio Augusto Junho Anastasia (Belo Horizonte, May 9, 1961) is a Brazilian lawyer and politician, affiliated to the Social Democratic Party. He graduated with a bachelor's and later a master's from the Federal University of Minas Gerais's Law School. 

He started his career in academia, working as a Law professor in the Milton Campos Law School and in the João Pinheiro Foundation. In 1993, he was approved in a competitive examination from his alma mater, UFMG, and was invested as a tenured Administrative Law professor. However, since 1988, Anastasia was involved with politics serving as an advisor to state deputy Bonifácio Mourão during the period the State Legislative Assembly worked as a Constitutional Assembly, after the end of Brazil's 20-year old Military Dictatorship.

During the administration of governor Hélio Garcia (1991-1994) he occupied several administrative posts, such as deputy-secretary of Planning and General Coordination, secretary of Culture, secretary of Human Resources and Management, and president of the João Pinheiro Foundation. From 1995 to 1998, he served as the deputy-minister of Labor in the administration of president Fernando Henrique Cardoso.

He was invited by then governor Aécio Neves to replace Clésio Andrade as his running mate for the 2006 election. Therefore, Anastasia served as vice governor of Minas Gerais from 2007 to 2010. In March 2010, Neves resigned to run for the Senate and Anastasia assumed the office of governor, serving the remainder of his predecessor's term. From 2011, Anastasia served as the elected governor of the state of Minas Gerais, a post he kept up to March 2014, when following his predecessor's example he resigned to run for the Senate.

After an unsuccessful campaign to be elected governor again in 2018, Anastasia kept his seat in the Senate. In 2019, he was picked by his peers to be the first vice president of the Senate for the biennium 2019-2020.

Anastasia announced he would disaffiliate with the PSDB and join the similarly named PSD in an effort to distance himself from his patron and former running mate Aécio Neves, involved in corruption scandals. That move would disqualify him were he a federal deputy, but as elections for the Senate are not proportional to the share of votes received by each party he was allowed to keep his seat.

On November 30, 2021 Justice Raimundo Carreiro's appointment as Brazil's new ambassador to Portugal was approved by the Senate, leaving a life-tenured vacancy at the Federal Court of Accounts (TCU) to be filled by the nomination of the Senate. Anastasia, supported by the President of the Senate Rodrigo Pacheco and his party PSD, presented his candidacy to substitute the retired justice at the TCU. Senators Kátia Abreu and Fernando Bezerra Coelho also presented their candidacies. The first vote in the upper house gave Anastasia a comfortable win, with 52 out of 81 votes going for him. Abreu received 19 votes and Bezerra only seven. The confirmation vote in the Chamber of Deputies was won easily with 322 votes supporting Anastasia's nomination, with only 18 votes against and 8 abstentions. Anastasia's appointed to TCU by president Jair Bolsonaro was published in Brazil's official gazette on February 1, 2022 simultaneously to the retirement of Anastasia's predecessor Raimundo Carreiro. Anastasia took office two days later.

References

|-

|-

|-

1961 births
Living people
Governors of Minas Gerais
Vice Governors of Minas Gerais
Brazilian Social Democracy Party politicians
Social Democratic Party (Brazil, 2011) politicians
Brazilian people of Greek descent
20th-century Brazilian lawyers
People from Belo Horizonte